Warren W. Woodcock (born 22 September 1936) is an Australian former amateur tennis player who competed in the 1950s and 1960s. He reached the quarterfinals of the Australian Championships in 1957 and the final of a US Pro Championship in 1967, losing to Sam Giammalva.

References

External links

Australian male tennis players
1936 births
Living people
Place of birth missing (living people)
Grand Slam (tennis) champions in boys' doubles
Australian Championships (tennis) junior champions